Anna Olegovna Karnaukh (born 31 August 1993) is a Russian water polo player. At the 2012 Summer Olympics, she competed for the Russia women's national water polo team in the women's event.

See also
 Russia women's Olympic water polo team records and statistics
 List of Olympic medalists in water polo (women)
 List of women's Olympic water polo tournament goalkeepers
 List of World Aquatics Championships medalists in water polo

References

External links
 

1993 births
Living people
Russian female water polo players
Water polo goalkeepers
Olympic water polo players of Russia
Water polo players at the 2012 Summer Olympics
Water polo players at the 2016 Summer Olympics
Olympic bronze medalists for Russia
Olympic medalists in water polo
Medalists at the 2016 Summer Olympics
World Aquatics Championships medalists in water polo
Universiade medalists in water polo
Universiade gold medalists for Russia
Medalists at the 2013 Summer Universiade
Water polo players at the 2020 Summer Olympics
People from Kirishi
Sportspeople from Leningrad Oblast
21st-century Russian women